The boys' light welterweight boxing competition at the 2018 Summer Youth Olympics in Buenos Aires was held from 14 to 18 October at the Oceania Pavilion.

Schedule 
All times are local (UTC−3).

Results

¹ AIBA doctors and national coaches from both teams have declared, in order to protect the safety of the athletes, USA’s Jones Otha and Kosovo’s Maliqi Erdonis unfit to compete today. Therefore, the bout is declared as No Contest.

Final standings

References

External links
Draw

Boxing at the 2018 Summer Youth Olympics